4000 or variation, may refer to:

 4000 (number)
 4000 BCE, a year in the 4th millennium BC
 A.D. 4000, the last year of the 4th millennium CE, a century leap year starting on Saturday
 4000s AD, a decade, century, millennium in the 5th millennium CE
 4000s BCE, a decade, century, millennium in the 5th millennium BC
 4000 Hipparchus, an asteroid in the Asteroid Belt, the 4000th asteroid registered
 Mobro 4000, a barge operated by MOBRO
 Weather Star 4000, a computer system used to display local forecasts on The Weather Channel
 Hawker 4000, a supermidsized businessjet
 Delta 4000, a rocket series
 Audi 4000, a compact executive sedan
 4000 (District of Shkodër), one of the postal codes in Albania
 4000-series integrated circuits

See also

 4000 A.D., a science-fiction board game
 
 4000 series (disambiguation)